Carmen Aub Romero (born October 24, 1989, in Mexico City, D.F., Mexico) is a Mexican actress.

Filmography

Film roles

Television roles

Awards and nominations

References

External links 

1989 births
Living people
Mexican telenovela actresses
Mexican film actresses
Actresses from Mexico City
21st-century Mexican actresses